Results for the Quarterfinals  of the 2013–14 Euroleague basketball tournament.

The quarterfinals were played in April, 2014. Team #1 (i.e., the group winner in each series) hosted Games 1 and 2, plus Game 5 if necessary. Team #2 hosted Game 3, plus Game 4 if necessary.

Some times given below are in Central European Time, and some others in Eastern European Time

Quarterfinals
Team 1 hosted Games 1 and 2, plus Game 5 if necessary. Team 2 hosted Game 3, and Game 4 if necessary.

Game 1

Game 2

Game 3

Game 4

Game 5

External links
Euroleague schedule

Quarterfinals